Hengfeng–Nanping railway, also known as the Hengnan railway, is a railroad in eastern China between Hengfeng, Jiangxi Province and Nanping, Fujian Province. Major cities along route include Hengfeng, Wuyishan, Jianyang, Jian'ou, and Nanping.

Route
The Hengfeng–Nanping railway connects Hengfeng, on the Shanghai–Kunming railway with Nanping, on the Nanping–Fuzhou railway and created Jiangxi's second rail connection with Fujian.  In 2006, the Ministry of Railways, after upgrading the line for higher speed train service, joined most of this line with the Hengfeng–Nanping railway to create the Hengfeng–Fuzhou railway or Hengfu railway.  The line passes through the Wuyi Mountains, a UNESCO World Heritage Site.

Rail connections
 Hengfeng: Shanghai–Kunming railway
 Nanping: Nanping–Fuzhou railway

See also

 List of railways in China

References

Railway lines in China
Rail transport in Jiangxi
Rail transport in Fujian
Nanping
Railway lines opened in 1998